Felix McCairney Reilly (12 September 1933 – 2 January 2018) was a Scottish professional footballer, who played as a forward.

Career
Born in Annathill, Reilly played for Shotts Bon Accord, Dunfermline Athletic,  Dundee, East Fife, Bradford Park Avenue, Crewe Alexandra and Altrincham.

Death
Reilly died on 2 January 2018 at his home in Comrie, Perthshire.

References

1933 births
2018 deaths
Scottish footballers
Shotts Bon Accord F.C. players
Dunfermline Athletic F.C. players
Dundee F.C. players
East Fife F.C. players
Bradford (Park Avenue) A.F.C. players
Crewe Alexandra F.C. players
Altrincham F.C. players
Scottish Football League players
English Football League players
Association football forwards
Scotland under-23 international footballers
Footballers from Coatbridge